Henri Leconte was the defending champion, but did not compete this year.

Emilio Sánchez won the title by defeating Paul McNamee 6–1, 6–3 in the final.

Seeds

Draw

Finals

Top half

Bottom half

References

External links
 Official results archive (ATP)
 Official results archive (ITF)

1986 Grand Prix (tennis)
1986 Singles